Černá sobota  (Black Saturday) is a 1960 Czechoslovak film. The film starred Josef Kemr.

References

External links
 
 Černá sobota in a catalog of National Film Archive Prague

1960 films
Czechoslovak crime drama films
1960s Czech-language films
Czech crime drama films
1960s Czech films